Antonio Tongio Kho Jr. (born June 29, 1966) is an associate justice of the Supreme Court of the Philippines. He was appointed by president Rodrigo Duterte to replace justice Rosmari Carandang.

Early life and education 

Kho was born in 1966 in Jolo, Sulu. He received his Bachelor of Laws degree from the San Beda College of Law in 1991, where he was part of the Lex Talionis Fraternitas fraternity.

Career 

Kho served as an undersecretary in the Depeartment of Justice under former secretary Vitaliano Aguirre II. In July 2018, Kho was appointed to COMELEC by president Rodrigo Duterte and he retired from the organization on February 2, 2022.

Supreme Court appointment 

On February 23, 2022, President Rodrigo Duterte appointed Kho to the Court, to fill the vacancy left by the retirement of Justice Rosmari Carandang. He took the oath of office on February 24, 2022. He will retire from the court on June 29, 2036.

References 

1966 births
Living people
Associate Justices of the Supreme Court of the Philippines
Commissioners of constitutional commissions of the Philippines
20th-century Filipino lawyers
People from Sulu
San Beda University alumni
21st-century Filipino judges